Tudaya Falls is a waterfall on the Davao del Sur stream. It is located in Mount Apo Natural Park, Bansalan, Davao del Sur, Mindanao in the Philippines. At 100 metres, it is the tallest waterfall in Mt. Apo Natural Park. This waterfall flows into the Sibulan River, which flows to Davao Gulf.

References

Landforms of Davao del Sur
Waterfalls of the Philippines